Roni Viirlas (born May 20, 1993) is a Finnish ice hockey defenceman. He is currently playing for Borås HC of the Hockeyettan.

Viirlas made his SM-liiga debut playing with Lukko during the 2012–13 SM-liiga season.

Awards and honours

References

External links

1993 births
Living people
Finnish ice hockey defencemen
Hokki players
Jokipojat players
Lempäälän Kisa players
Les Aigles de Nice players
Lukko players
Mikkelin Jukurit players
SaPKo players
Sportspeople from Turku
TuTo players